Claire or Clare Thomas may refer to:

Clare Thomas, actress
Claire Thomas, food enthusiast
Claire Curtis-Thomas, politician

Fictional characters
Claire Thomas (Harukana Receive), a character in the manga series Harukana Receive